Kusheh or Kushah may refer to:
 Kushah, Hormozgan
 Kusheh, Kermanshah
 Kusheh, Bardaskan, Razavi Khorasan Province
 Kusheh, Kashmar, Razavi Khorasan Province
 Kusheh, Sistan and Baluchestan
 Kusheh, South Khorasan
 Gusheh-ye Olya, South Khorasan
 Gusheh-ye Sofla, South Khorasan

See also
 Gusheh (disambiguation)
 Kusheh (disambiguation)
 Qusheh
 Kusheh Nama